Liga Deportiva Universitaria de Quito's 1979 season was the club's 49th year of existence, the 26th year in professional football, the 19th in the top level of professional football in Ecuador.

Kits
Sponsor(s): Ecuacolor

Competitions

Serie A

First stage

Results

Second stage

Results

Liguilla Final

Results

References
RSSSF - 1979 Serie A

External links
Official Site

1979